Thoracocare is a minute to very small (1.7 – 3.6 mm long) trilobite, that lived during part of the Middle Cambrian in what are today the states of Idaho, Nevada and Utah. It is the only trilobite known with just two thorax segments outside most members of the Agnostida order. It can be distinguished from Agnostida by the very wide subquadrate glabella (about half the cephalon), parallel-side or widening forward in the largest specimen, with the full front side  touching the border. Two species are known, one, T. idahoensis, only from pygidia.

Etymology 
Thoracocare is derived from the Greek θώραξ (thorax) meaning "breastplate" and ἀκαρής (akares) meaning "tiny".

Distribution 
T. minuta is known from the Middle Cambrian of the United States  (Glossopleura-zone, Spence Tongue Member, Lead Bell Shale/Spence Shale Formation, Idaho, 42.0° N, 112.0° W).
T. idahoensis was collected from the Middle Cambrian of the United States  (Glossopleura-zone, north side of Two Mile Canyon, Malad Range, and the top bed of the Naomi Peak Limestone, both in Idaho; lower and middle Albertella-zone, Belted Range, Nevada)

Ecology 
Thoracocare minuta occurs in the same deposit as Pagetia rugosa, Pentagnostus bonnerensis, Elrathina spencei, Oryctocare sp., Oryctocephalus walcotti, and Ogygopsis typicalis. Scholars consider that Thoracocare minuta may have lived in the water column (a pelagic lifestyle) rather than on the seafloor.

Description 
Thoracocare is a very small to minute trilobite (1.7 – 3.6 mm long in adulthood), with an elliptical body outline. The headshield (or cephalon) and tailshield (or pygidium) are of approximately same size (or isopygous) with 2 thoracic segments between them. The central raised area of the cephalon (or glabella) is broad, subrectangular, tapering slightly to the back in larger specimens and touching the frontal border, and without transverse furrows. Fixed cheeks are subtriangular. Free cheeks are rarely present. Dorsal sutures are proparian. The pygidium is subcircular, about 1⅔× as wide as long. The segmentation of the pygidial axis (or rhachis) and pleura is indiscernible or very weak. The rhachis is about ⅓ of the pygidial width anteriorly, tapering evenly backwards. There is no pygidial border. There may be small spines extending from the frontal corners of the pygidium.

Differences with other Corynexochida 
All other known corynexochoid genera have at least five thorax segments. Other early (Middle Cambrian) species also differ by having less wide glabellas and better defined pygidial furrows.

Differences with Agnostida 
In Thoracocare minuta the glabella is more than ⅓ of the width of the cephalon, is parallel sided or expands forward and reaches the frontal border. It also lacks a pygidial border.

References 

Corynexochina
Corynexochida genera
Cambrian trilobites of North America
Fossils of the United States
Cambrian genus extinctions